Nuno Miguel Gomes dos Santos (born 13 February 1995) is a Portuguese professional footballer who plays for Sporting CP as a winger.

Club career

Benfica
Born in Trofa, Porto metropolitan area, Santos began his development at local C.D. Trofense before joining the ranks of FC Porto, and after a year at Rio Ave F.C. he signed for S.L. Benfica in 2013. On 30 August 2014, he made his professional debut with their reserves in the Segunda Liga, coming on as a 69th-minute substitute for João Amorim in a 3–1 home win against S.C. Covilhã. He scored eight goals in 36 games in his first season, starting in a 3–2 loss at S.C. Braga B on 14 December. On 14 February 2015, he scored twice in a 4–1 home victory over U.D. Oliveirense (4–1).

Santos made his only appearance for the first team in the Primeira Liga on 11 September 2015, playing the final 11 minutes in place of Pizzi in a 6–0 home rout of C.F. Os Belenenses. That December, he suffered an injury to his left knee that was still an issue when he signed a season-long loan to fellow top-flight club Vitória F.C. in June 2016.

Rio Ave
On 16 June 2017, Santos signed a five-year contract with Rio Ave also of the top tier. Almost exclusively a substitute in his first season, he scored once for his first goal in the league on 17 September, at the end of a 1–2 home defeat to eventual champions FC Porto.

Santos suffered more problems with his left knee in July 2018, and did not return to the pitch until the following March. On 17 June 2020, he was one of three players in his team to be sent off in a 2–1 home loss to Benfica – for a high foot on Pizzi – and was subjected to social media abuse by his club's fans.

Sporting CP
On 21 August 2020, Santos joined Sporting CP on a five-year deal for €4 million plus shares in the economic rights of Gelson Dala (50%) and Francisco Geraldes (75%), and a buyout clause of €60 million. He scored eight competitive goals in his first season for the champions, seven in the league.

International career
Santos was part of the Portuguese squad at the 2015 FIFA U-20 World Cup, scoring an early goal against Senegal (3–0) and a late one against Colombia (3–1 win) in the group stage, in an eventual quarter-final exit in New Zealand. He won the first of his two caps for the under-21 side on 12 November of that year, replacing Rony Lopes midway through the second half of the 4–0 victory over Albania for the 2017 UEFA European Championship qualifiers held in Arouca.

In October 2022, Santos was named in a preliminary 55-man squad for the 2022 FIFA World Cup in Qatar.

Career statistics

Honours
Benfica Youth
UEFA Youth League runner-up: 2013–14

Benfica
Primeira Liga: 2015–16

Sporting CP
Primeira Liga: 2020–21
Taça da Liga: 2020–21, 2021–22 
Supertaça Cândido de Oliveira: 2021

References

External links

1995 births
Living people
Sportspeople from Trofa
Portuguese footballers
Association football wingers
Primeira Liga players
Liga Portugal 2 players
C.D. Trofense players
FC Porto players
Padroense F.C. players
Rio Ave F.C. players
S.L. Benfica B players
S.L. Benfica footballers
Vitória F.C. players
Sporting CP footballers
Portugal youth international footballers
Portugal under-21 international footballers